Gordah or Gerdeh or Gordeh may refer to:
 Gerdeh, Ardabil
 Gerdeh Layan, East Azerbaijan Province
 Gordeh, Fars
 Gordah, Hormozgan
 Gerdeh Kohneh, Lorestan Province
 Gerdeh Rural District, in Ardabil Province